G. N. Whitman was a United States politician. Whitman served as a member of the 1859 California State Assembly, representing the 1st District.

References

Democratic Party members of the California State Assembly